Voros may refer to:

 Võros, ethnic group in Estonia
 Aaron Voros (1981), Canadian former professional ice hockey player
 Jerry Voros (1930), chairman of the International Committee of the Boy Scouts of America
 Voros McCracken (1971), American baseball sabermetrician